Kenny Mwansa (born 14 July 1949) is a Zambian boxer. He competed in the men's flyweight event at the 1968 Summer Olympics. At the 1968 Summer Olympics, he defeated Rodolfo Díaz of the Philippines, before losing to Nikolay Novikov of the Soviet Union.

References

1949 births
Living people
Zambian male boxers
Olympic boxers of Zambia
Boxers at the 1968 Summer Olympics
People from Luanshya
Flyweight boxers